The 2023 Toronto Blue Jays season will be the 47th season of the Toronto Blue Jays franchise, and the Blue Jays’ 32nd full season (34th overall) at Rogers Centre. They are scheduled to start the season on the road against the St. Louis Cardinals on March 30, and finish the season at home against the Rays on October 1.

Previous season 
The 2022 Blue Jays finished 2nd in the AL East, to the New York Yankees, with a record of 92–70 (.556). They qualified for the postseason, but lost in the Wild Card Series to the Seattle Mariners.

Offseason

Departing Free Agents 
 On November 6, 2022: RHP David Phelps & RHP Ross Stripling elected free agency
 On November 7, 2022: OF Jackie Bradley Jr. elected free agency
 On November 10, 2022: LHP Trey Cumbie, RHP Jose De Leon, RHP Jake Elliott, C Ryan Gold, RHP Casey Lawrence, RHP Brady Lail, RHP Elvis Luciano, INF Eric Stamets, OF Yoshi Tsutsugo & RHP Eric Yardley elected free agency
 On November 15, 2022: LHP Foster Griffin was released
 On November 18, 2022: INF Vinny Capra, OF Raimel Tapia & OF Bradley Zimmer elected free agency
 On February 6, 2023: LHP Matt Gage was released

Trades 
 On November 16, 2022: Acquired RHP Erik Swanson and LHP prospect Adam Macko from the Seattle Mariners in exchange for OF Teoscar Hernández
 On December 23, 2022: Acquired OF Daulton Varsho from the Arizona Diamondbacks in exchange for OF Lourdes Gurriel Jr. and C Gabriel Moreno
 On January 10, 2023: Acquired RHP Zach Thompson from the Pittsburgh Pirates in exchange for OF Chavez Young

Waiver Transactions 
 On November 9, 2022: LHP Tayler Saucedo claimed off waivers by the New York Mets
 On December 23, 2022: RHP Anthony Kay claimed off waivers by the Chicago Cubs
 On January 5, 2023: RHP Junior Fernández claimed off waivers from the New York Yankees
 On January 17, 2023: RHP Julian Merryweather claimed off waivers by the Chicago Cubs
 On February 13, 2023: LHP Matt Gage claimed off release waivers by the Houston Astros

Free Agent Signings 
 On November 19, 2022: Signed INF Vinny Capra to a minor league contract
 On December 15, 2022: Signed OF Kevin Kiermaier to a one-year, $9 million deal
 On December 16, 2022: Signed RHP Chris Bassitt to a three-year, $63 million deal
 On December 30, 2022: Signed RHP Casey Lawrence to a minor league contract
 On January 6, 2023: Signed C Rob Brantly, RHP Julian Fernández, LHP Paul Fry & RHP Drew Hutchinson to minor league contracts.
 On January 10, 2023: Signed INF Brandon Belt to a one-year, $9.3 million deal Signed RHP Nathan Witt to a minor league contract.
 On January 15, 2023: Signed RHP Samuel Acuna, LHP Andersson Barvosa, OF Emmanuel Bonilla, RHP Samuel Colmenares, C Ivan Gomez, LHP Eduar Gonzalez, OF David Guzman, INF Adrian Meza, INF Jarold Montealto, RHP Sann Omasako, OF Daniel Perez & C Juan Rosas as international free agents, to minor league contracts.
 On January 20, 2023: Signed OF Wynton Bernard to a minor league contract.
 On January 23, 2023: Signed OF Cawrin Salcedo to a minor league contract.
 On January 30, 2023: Signed RHP Chad Green to a two-year, $8.5 million deal.
 On January 31, 2023: Signed C Jamie Ritchie to a minor league contract.
 On February 11, 2023: Signed RHP Luke Bard to a minor league contract.

Coaching Changes 
 On November 30, 2022: Don Mattingly joins the Toronto Blue Jays as Bench Coach.
 On January 15, 2023: Bullpen Coach Matt Buschmann resigns from the Toronto Blue Jays.
 On January 31, 2023: David Howell and Jeff Ware joins the Toronto Blue Jays as Pitching Strategist and Bullpen Coach respectively.

Records vs opponents

Regular season

Game log  

|- style="background:#;"
| 1 || March 30 || @ Cardinals || – || || || — || || – ||
|-

|- style="background:#;"
| 2 || April 1 || @ Cardinals || – || || || — || || – ||
|- style="background:#;"
| 3 || April 2 || @ Cardinals || – || || || — || || – ||
|- style="background:#;"
| 4 || April 3 || @ Royals || – || || || — || || – ||
|- style="background:#;"
| 5 || April 4 || @ Royals || – || || || — || || – ||
|- style="background:#;"
| 6 || April 5 || @ Royals || – || || || — || || – ||
|- style="background:#;"
| 7 || April 6 || @ Royals || – || || || — || || – ||
|- style="background:#;"
| 8 || April 7 || @ Angels || – || || || — || || – ||
|- style="background:#;"
| 9 || April 8 || @ Angels || – || || || — || || – ||
|- style="background:#;"
| 10 || April 9 || @ Angels || – || || || — || || – ||
|- style="background:#;"
| 11 || April 11 || Tigers || – || || || — || || – ||
|- style="background:#;"
| 12 || April 12 || Tigers || – || || || — || || – ||
|- style="background:#;"
| 13 || April 13 || Tigers || – || || || — || || – ||
|- style="background:#;"
| 14 || April 14 || Rays || – || || || — || || – ||
|- style="background:#;"
| 15 || April 15 || Rays || – || || || — || || – ||
|- style="background:#;"
| 16 || April 16 || Rays || – || || || — || || – ||
|- style="background:#;"
| 17 || April 17 || @ Astros || – || || || — || || – ||
|- style="background:#;"
| 18 || April 18 || @ Astros || – || || || — || || – ||
|- style="background:#;"
| 19 || April 19 || @ Astros || – || || || — || || – ||
|- style="background:#;"
| 20 || April 21 || @ Yankees || – || || || — || || – ||
|- style="background:#;"
| 21 || April 22 || @ Yankees || – || || || — || || – ||
|- style="background:#;"
| 22 || April 23 || @ Yankees || – || || || — || || – ||
|- style="background:#;"
| 23 || April 24 || White Sox || – || || || — || || – ||
|- style="background:#;"
| 24 || April 25 || White Sox || – || || || — || || – ||
|- style="background:#;"
| 25 || April 26 || White Sox || – || || || — || || – ||
|- style="background:#;"
| 26 || April 28 || Mariners || – || || || — || || – ||
|- style="background:#;"
| 27 || April 29 || Mariners || – || || || — || || – ||
|- style="background:#;"
| 28 || April 30 || Mariners || – || || || — || || – ||
|-

|- style="background:#;"
| 29 || May 1 || @ Red Sox || – || || || — || || – ||
|- style="background:#;"
| 30 || May 2 || @ Red Sox || – || || || — || || – ||
|- style="background:#;"
| 31 || May 3 || @ Red Sox || – || || || — || || – ||
|- style="background:#;"
| 32 || May 4 || @ Red Sox || – || || || — || || – ||
|- style="background:#;"
| 33 || May 5 || @ Pirates || – || || || — || || – ||
|- style="background:#;"
| 34 || May 6 || @ Pirates || – || || || — || || – ||
|- style="background:#;"
| 35 || May 7 || @ Pirates || – || || || — || || – ||
|- style="background:#;"
| 36 || May 9 || @ Phillies || – || || || — || || – ||
|- style="background:#;"
| 37 || May 10 || @ Phillies || – || || || — || || – ||
|- style="background:#;"
| 38 || May 12 || Braves || – || || || — || || – ||
|- style="background:#;"
| 39 || May 13 || Braves || – || || || — || || – ||
|- style="background:#;"
| 40 || May 14 || Braves || – || || || — || || – ||
|- style="background:#;"
| 41 || May 15 || Yankees || – || || || — || || – ||
|- style="background:#;"
| 42 || May 16 || Yankees || – || || || — || || – ||
|- style="background:#;"
| 43 || May 17 || Yankees || – || || || — || || – ||
|- style="background:#;"
| 44 || May 18 || Yankees || – || || || — || || – ||
|- style="background:#;"
| 45 || May 19 || Orioles || – || || || — || || – ||
|- style="background:#;"
| 46 || May 20 || Orioles || – || || || — || || – ||
|- style="background:#;"
| 47 || May 21 || Orioles || – || || || — || || – ||
|- style="background:#;"
| 48 || May 22 || @ Rays || – || || || — || || – ||
|- style="background:#;"
| 49 || May 23 || @ Rays || – || || || — || || – ||
|- style="background:#;"
| 50 || May 24 || @ Rays || – || || || — || || – ||
|- style="background:#;"
| 51 || May 25 || @ Rays || – || || || — || || – ||
|- style="background:#;"
| 52 || May 26 || @ Twins || – || || || — || || – ||
|- style="background:#;"
| 53 || May 27 || @ Twins || – || || || — || || – ||
|- style="background:#;"
| 54 || May 28 || @ Twins || – || || || — || || – ||
|- style="background:#;"
| 55 || May 30 || Brewers || – || || || — || || – ||
|- style="background:#;"
| 56 || May 31 || Brewers || – || || || — || || – ||
|-

|- style="background:#;"
| 57 || June 1 || Brewers || – || || || — || || – ||
|- style="background:#;"
| 58 || June 2 || @ Mets || – || || || — || || – ||
|- style="background:#;"
| 59 || June 3 || @ Mets || – || || || — || || – ||
|- style="background:#;"
| 60 || June 4 || @ Mets || – || || || — || || – ||
|- style="background:#;"
| 61 || June 5 || Astros || – || || || — || || – ||
|- style="background:#;"
| 62 || June 6 || Astros || – || || || — || || – ||
|- style="background:#;"
| 63 || June 7 || Astros || – || || || — || || – ||
|- style="background:#;"
| 64 || June 8 || Astros || – || || || — || || – ||
|- style="background:#;"
| 65 || June 9 || Twins || – || || || — || || – ||
|- style="background:#;"
| 66 || June 10 || Twins || – || || || — || || – ||
|- style="background:#;"
| 67 || June 11 || Twins || – || || || — || || – ||
|- style="background:#;"
| 68 || June 13 || @ Orioles || – || || || — || || – ||
|- style="background:#;"
| 69 || June 14 || @ Orioles || – || || || — || || – ||
|- style="background:#;"
| 70 || June 15 || @ Orioles || – || || || — || || – ||
|- style="background:#;"
| 71 || June 16 || @ Rangers || – || || || — || || – ||
|- style="background:#;"
| 72 || June 17 || @ Rangers || – || || || — || || – ||
|- style="background:#;"
| 73 || June 18 || @ Rangers || – || || || — || || – ||
|- style="background:#;"
| 74 || June 19 || @ Marlins || – || || || — || || – ||
|- style="background:#;"
| 75 || June 20 || @ Marlins || – || || || — || || – ||
|- style="background:#;"
| 76 || June 21 || @ Marlins || – || || || — || || – ||
|- style="background:#;"
| 77 || June 23 || Athletics || – || || || — || || – ||
|- style="background:#;"
| 78 || June 24 || Athletics || – || || || — || || – ||
|- style="background:#;"
| 79 || June 25 || Athletics || – || || || — || || – ||
|- style="background:#;"
| 80 || June 27 || Giants || – || || || — || || – ||
|- style="background:#;"
| 81 || June 28 || Giants || – || || || — || || – ||
|- style="background:#;"
| 82 || June 29 || Giants || – || || || — || || – ||
|- style="background:#;"
| 83 || June 30 || Red Sox || – || || || — || || – ||
|-

|- style="background:#;"
| 84 || July 1 || Red Sox || – || || || — || || – ||
|- style="background:#;"
| 85 || July 2 || Red Sox || – || || || — || || – ||
|- style="background:#;"
| 86 || July 4 || @ White Sox || – || || || — || || – ||
|- style="background:#;"
| 87 || July 5 || @ White Sox || – || || || — || || – ||
|- style="background:#;"
| 88 || July 6 || @ White Sox || – || || || — || || – ||
|- style="background:#;"
| 89 || July 7 || @ Tigers || – || || || — || || – ||
|- style="background:#;"
| 90 || July 8 || @ Tigers || – || || || — || || – ||
|- style="background:#;"
| 91 || July 9 || @ Tigers || – || || || — || || – ||
|- style="background:#;"
| 92 || July 14 || Diamondbacks || – || || || — || || – ||
|- style="background:#;"
| 93 || July 15 || Diamondbacks || – || || || — || || – ||
|- style="background:#;"
| 94 || July 16 || Diamondbacks || – || || || — || || – ||
|- style="background:#;"
| 95 || July 18 || Padres || – || || || — || || – ||
|- style="background:#;"
| 96 || July 19 || Padres || – || || || — || || – ||
|- style="background:#;"
| 97 || July 20 || Padres || – || || || — || || – ||
|- style="background:#;"
| 98 || July 21 || @ Mariners || – || || || — || || – ||
|- style="background:#;"
| 99 || July 22 || @ Mariners || – || || || — || || – ||
|- style="background:#;"
| 100 || July 23 || @ Mariners || – || || || — || || – ||
|- style="background:#;"
| 101 || July 24 || @ Dodgers || – || || || — || || – ||
|- style="background:#;"
| 102 || July 25 || @ Dodgers || – || || || — || || – ||
|- style="background:#;"
| 103 || July 26 || @ Dodgers || – || || || — || || – ||
|- style="background:#;"
| 104 || July 28 || Angels || – || || || — || || – ||
|- style="background:#;"
| 105 || July 29 || Angels || – || || || — || || – ||
|- style="background:#;"
| 106 || July 30 || Angels || – || || || — || || – ||
|- style="background:#;"
| 107 || July 31 || Orioles || – || || || — || || – ||
|-

|- style="background:#;"
| 108 || August 1 || Orioles || – || || || — || || – ||
|- style="background:#;"
| 109 || August 2 || Orioles || – || || || — || || – ||
|- style="background:#;"
| 110 || August 3 || Orioles || – || || || — || || – ||
|- style="background:#;"
| 111 || August 4 || @ Red Sox || – || || || — || || – ||
|- style="background:#;"
| 112 || August 5 || @ Red Sox || – || || || — || || – ||
|- style="background:#;"
| 113 || August 6 || @ Red Sox || – || || || — || || – ||
|- style="background:#;"
| 114 || August 7 || @ Guardians || – || || || — || || – ||
|- style="background:#;"
| 115 || August 8 || @ Guardians || – || || || — || || – ||
|- style="background:#;"
| 116 || August 9 || @ Guardians || – || || || — || || – ||
|- style="background:#;"
| 117 || August 10 || @ Guardians || – || || || — || || – ||
|- style="background:#;"
| 118 || August 11 || Cubs || – || || || — || || – ||
|- style="background:#;"
| 119 || August 12 || Cubs || – || || || — || || – ||
|- style="background:#;"
| 120 || August 13 || Cubs || – || || || — || || – ||
|- style="background:#;"
| 121 || August 15 || Phillies || – || || || — || || – ||
|- style="background:#;"
| 122 || August 16 || Phillies || – || || || — || || – ||
|- style="background:#;"
| 123 || August 18 || @ Reds || – || || || — || || – ||
|- style="background:#;"
| 124 || August 19 || @ Reds || – || || || — || || – ||
|- style="background:#;"
| 125 || August 20 || @ Reds || – || || || — || || – ||
|- style="background:#;"
| 126 || August 22 || @ Orioles || – || || || — || || – ||
|- style="background:#;"
| 127 || August 23 || @ Orioles || – || || || — || || – ||
|- style="background:#;"
| 128 || August 24 || @ Orioles || – || || || — || || – ||
|- style="background:#;"
| 129 || August 25 || Guardians || – || || || — || || – ||
|- style="background:#;"
| 130 || August 26 || Guardians || – || || || — || || – ||
|- style="background:#;"
| 131 || August 27 || Guardians || – || || || — || || – ||
|- style="background:#;"
| 132 || August 28 || Nationals || – || || || — || || – ||
|- style="background:#;"
| 133 || August 29 || Nationals || – || || || — || || – ||
|- style="background:#;"
| 134 || August 30 || Nationals || – || || || — || || – ||
|-

|- style="background:#;"
| 135 || September 1 || @ Rockies || – || || || — || || – ||
|- style="background:#;"
| 136 || September 2 || @ Rockies || – || || || — || || – ||
|- style="background:#;"
| 137 || September 3 || @ Rockies || – || || || — || || – ||
|- style="background:#;"
| 138 || September 4 || @ Athletics || – || || || — || || – ||
|- style="background:#;"
| 139 || September 5 || @ Athletics || – || || || — || || – ||
|- style="background:#;"
| 140 || September 6 || @ Athletics || – || || || — || || – ||
|- style="background:#;"
| 141 || September 8 || Royals || – || || || — || || – ||
|- style="background:#;"
| 142 || September 9 || Royals || – || || || — || || – ||
|- style="background:#;"
| 143 || September 10 || Royals || – || || || — || || – ||
|- style="background:#;"
| 144 || September 11 || Rangers || – || || || — || || – ||
|- style="background:#;"
| 145 || September 12 || Rangers || – || || || — || || – ||
|- style="background:#;"
| 146 || September 13 || Rangers || – || || || — || || – ||
|- style="background:#;"
| 147 || September 14 || Rangers || – || || || — || || – ||
|- style="background:#;"
| 148 || September 15 || Red Sox || – || || || — || || – ||
|- style="background:#;"
| 149 || September 16 || Red Sox || – || || || — || || – ||
|- style="background:#;"
| 150 || September 17 || Red Sox || – || || || — || || – ||
|- style="background:#;"
| 151 || September 19 || @ Yankees || – || || || — || || – ||
|- style="background:#;"
| 152 || September 20 || @ Yankees || – || || || — || || – ||
|- style="background:#;"
| 153 || September 21 || @ Yankees || – || || || — || || – ||
|- style="background:#;"
| 154 || September 22 || @ Rays || – || || || — || || – ||
|- style="background:#;"
| 155 || September 23 || @ Rays || – || || || — || || – ||
|- style="background:#;"
| 156 || September 24 || @ Rays || – || || || — || || – ||
|- style="background:#;"
| 157 || September 26 || Yankees || – || || || — || || – ||
|- style="background:#;"
| 158 || September 27 || Yankees || – || || || — || || – ||
|- style="background:#;"
| 159 || September 28 || Yankees || – || || || — || || – ||
|- style="background:#;"
| 160 || September 29 || Rays || – || || || — || || – ||
|- style="background:#;"
| 161 || September 30 || Rays || – || || || — || || – ||
|-

|- style="background:#;"
| 162 || October 1 || Rays || – || || || — || || – ||
|-

Roster

Farm system

References

External links
2023 Toronto Blue Jays at baseball reference

Toronto Blue Jays seasons
Toronto Blue Jays
Toronto Blue Jays
Toronto Blue Jays